Guard Mountain is a  summit in British Columbia, Canada.

Description
Guard Mountain is located within Garibaldi Provincial Park on the southeast side of Garibaldi Lake, and is part of the Garibaldi Ranges of the Coast Mountains. Precipitation runoff from the peak drains into Garibaldi Lake and topographic relief is significant as the summit rises 700 meters (2,300 feet) above the lake in one kilometer (0.6 mile). The mountain's toponym was officially adopted on October 4, 1932, by the Geographical Names Board of Canada.

Climate

Based on the Köppen climate classification, Guard Mountain is located in the marine west coast climate zone of western North America. Most weather fronts originate in the Pacific Ocean, and travel east toward the Coast Mountains where they are forced upward by the range (Orographic lift), causing them to drop their moisture in the form of rain or snowfall. As a result, the Coast Mountains experience high precipitation, especially during the winter months in the form of snowfall. Winter temperatures can drop below −20 °C with wind chill factors below −30 °C. This climate supports the Sphinx Glacier on the east side of the mountain.

See also
 
 Geography of British Columbia

Gallery

References

External links
 Guard Mountain: Weather forecast

Garibaldi Ranges
Two-thousanders of British Columbia
Sea-to-Sky Corridor
New Westminster Land District
Coast Mountains